Andelot-Blancheville is a commune in the Haute-Marne department in the Grand Est region in northeastern France. It lies on the river Rognon, a tributary of the Marne.

Population

Treaty (587)
It was the site of an important pact, known as the treaty of Andelot, by which king Guntram of Burgundy and queen Brunehaut agreed that Guntram was to adopt her and Sigebert I of Austrasia's son Childebert II as his successor, and ally himself with Childebert against the revolted leudes.

It also brought about the cession of Tours by Guntram to Childebert II.

Personalities
François de Coligny, the younger brother of the huguenots admiral Coligny and cardinal Coligny, born in 1521 at Châtillon-sur-Loing, was styled seigneur d'Andelot; but the castle of Andelot was not in the Andelot-Blancheville city, but at Andelot village (now called Andelot-Morval, in the Jura department).
Michel Pignolet de Montéclair, composer, was born in Andelot.

See also
Communes of the Haute-Marne department

References
Nouveau Petit Larousse Illustré (1952, in French)

Communes of Haute-Marne